Frank and Ernest may refer to:
Frank and Ernest (comic strip)
Frank and Ernest (broadcast)
Frank and Ernest Denouement